Fort Mitchel may refer to:

Fort Mitchel, an 18th-century fort on Spike Island, County Cork
Fort Mitchel, a defensive structure built on the location that was known as Mitchelville in South Carolina
Fort Mitchel, a military site related to the Defense of Cincinnati, Ohio

See also
Fort Mitchell (disambiguation)